Hugh Detmar O'Neill, 3rd Baron Rathcavan (born 14 June 1939), is a hereditary peer who sat as a crossbencher in the British House of Lords from 1994 until 1999.

He was educated at Eton College.

O'Neill ran Lamont, a textile company in Northern Ireland, in the 1980s and was chairman of the Northern Ireland Tourist Board before taking on the Brasserie St Quentin in Knightsbridge in 2002.

External links 
 Debrett's People of Today

Notes

1939 births
Living people
People educated at Eton College
High Sheriffs of Antrim
Crossbench hereditary peers

Rathcavan